This is a list of FM & AM radio stations in Bandung, Indonesia, and their frequencies:

References

Bandung, Indonesia
Bandung